Tavares is a city in the central portion of the U.S. state of Florida. It is the county seat of Lake County. The population at the 2020 census was 19,003, and in 2019 the population was estimated to be 17,749. It is part of the Orlando–Kissimmee–Sanford Metropolitan Statistical Area. The name is a popular Portuguese surname and toponym.

History
 
Organized in 1885, and completed in 1888 on land donated by St. Clair-Abrams, the Union Congregational Church was the first church in Tavares.

Tavares was founded in 1880 by Alexander St. Clair-Abrams, a newspaper and railroad man from a Creole family in New Orleans . He gave it the surname of a Portuguese ancestor. In 1883 a post office was established; by the next year, a hotel, three stores, a sawmill, and eight cottages were built. St. Clair-Abrams's dream of Tavares as the state capital was not realized, but in 1887 it was designated the county seat of Lake County. St. Clair-Abrams later chartered a railroad from Tavares to Orlando. In 1919, Tavares incorporated as a town.

Groveland Four 

In 1949, the Groveland Four, were wrongly accused of raping a white woman in 1949. One was killed after fleeing, and three were convicted at trial in Tavares. The two adults were sentenced to death and the minor to life in prison. The Supreme Court of the United States overturned the verdict and ordered a new trial for the two capital defendants. One was killed while being transported to Tavares in 1951. Walter Irvin survived the shooting by the sheriff and was convicted again at trial. In 1955, his death sentence was commuted to life. He was paroled in 1968 and died in 1970. In 2016, the city of Groveland and Lake County formally apologized to families of all the men for injustice; in 2017, the Florida Legislature issued a formal apology and exonerated the men, calling on the governor to officially pardon them.

Geography

Tavares is at  (28.801670, –81.733548). It sits on an isthmus between Lake Eustis to the north and Lake Dora to the south. The city of Eustis borders Tavares to the northeast, and Lake Harris is to the west.

U.S. Route 441 passes through the north side of Tavares, leading east  to Mount Dora and west  to Leesburg. Florida State Road 19 joins US 441 through part of Tavares, but leads northeast  to Eustis and southwest  to Florida's Turnpike in the outskirts of Groveland.

Demographics

As of the census of 2000, there were 9,700 people, 4,471 households, and 2,821 families residing in the city. The city's racial makeup was 88.98% White, 7.70% African American, 0.30% Native American, 0.80% Asian, 0.07% Pacific Islander, 1.04% from other races, and 1.10% from two or more races. Hispanic or Latino of any race were 3.46% of the population.

There were 4,471 households, of which 16.1% had children under the age of 18 living with them, 51.8% were married couples living together, 9.3% had a female householder with no husband present, and 36.9% were non-families. 33.0% of all households were made up of individuals, and 21.2% had someone living alone who was 65 years of age or older. The average household size was 2.01 and the average family size was 2.48.

In the city, 14.1% of the population was under the age of 18, 5.8% between 18 and 24, 19.8% between 25 and 44, 22.2% between 45 and 64, and 38.0% over 64. The median age was 56. For every 100 females, there were 92.8 males. For every 100 females age 18 and over, there were 90.9 males.

The median household income was $31,337, and the median family income $36,243. Males had a median income of $28,911 versus $20,271 for females. The per capita income was $19,942. About 6.6% of families and 10.3% of the population were below the poverty line, including 18.2% of those under age 18 and 6.9% of those 65 or older.

Libraries
Tavares Public Library
The Lake County Library System is headquartered in Tavares.

Transportation 
The Tavares Seaplane Base is a city-owned, public-use seaplane base on Lake Dora in Tavares. The base is popular and gives rise to the city's nickname, "America's Seaplane City".

The LakeXpress is Lake County's public transportation and has been active since May 2007. It is a fixed-route transportation service that runs every hour from Lady Lake to Mount Dora with circulator routes in Leesburg and Mount Dora.

Notable people
Alfred St. Clair-Abrams, politician
Alexander St. Clair Abrams, politician and town's founder
 Melton Haynes, early settler
 Mallory Horne, member of the Florida Legislature
 Fireball Roberts, NASCAR driver
 Jermaine Taylor, NBA player

Gallery

References

External links

 
 Tavares Public Library
 VisitTavares.com

1880 establishments in Florida
Cities in Florida
Cities in Lake County, Florida
County seats in Florida
Greater Orlando
Populated places established in 1880